"Courage" is a song recorded by Canadian singer Celine Dion for her twelfth English-language studio album, Courage (2019). It was written by Stephan Moccio, Erik Alcock and Liz Rodrigues, and produced by Moccio. "Courage" was released as a digital download on 18 September 2019. On the same day, Dion embarked on her Courage World Tour, where she performed the song. "Courage" entered sales charts in Canada and France, and received positive reviews from music critics. The black and white music video premiered on 13 November 2019. In March 2020, the song was sent to radio in Quebec.

Background and release
"Courage" was written by Stephan Moccio, Erik Alcock and Liz Rodrigues. It was produced by Moccio. Together with the songs "Imperfections" and "Lying Down", it was released as a digital download on 18 September 2019, the day Dion started her Courage World Tour, promoting her album Courage. "Courage" is an emotional piano ballad, dealing with the loss of a loved one. Previously, Moccio co-wrote for Dion her 2002 single, "A New Day Has Come".

Critical reception
The song received positive critical reviews. According to A Bit of Pop Music, "Courage" has a very personal content. It is a piano and strings based emotional power ballad, dealing with the loss of a person close to you. With the death of her husband René Angélil in 2016, "Courage" must be close to Dion's heart and she sings it with emotive vocals and a lot of passion. Mike Wass from Idolator described "Courage" as a simple piano ballad that lets Dion pull the vocal trigger as she shares important life lessons. It is raw and very emotional.

Commercial performance
After being released as a digital download on 18 September 2019, "Courage" debuted on several sales charts and reached number two in Quebec and number 20 in Canada. In March 2021, it was serviced to contemporary hit radio formats in Quebec, where it peaked at number three.

Music video
The audio of "Courage" was uploaded on YouTube on 18 September 2019. The music video, directed by Se Oh and filmed entirely in black and white, premiered on 13 November 2019. Kai Krause worked on it as a cinematographer and Marco Venditto as a lighting director. The video was produced by Mad Ruk Entertainment and Telescope Films.

Credits and personnel

Stephan Moccio – producer, composer, lyricist, piano, keyboards, background vocal
Erik Alcock – composer, lyricist
Liz Rodrigues – composer, lyricist
TommyD – string session co-producer
Jay Paul Bicknell – background vocal, engineer
Kylen Deporter – background vocal, engineer
Wired Strings – strings
Rosie Danvers – string arranger
Nick Taylor – engineer
François Lalonde – recording engineer
Serban Ghenea – mixing engineer
John Hanes – assistant engineer
Rob Katz – assistant engineer
Vlado Meller – mastering engineer
John McL. Doelp – executive producer

Source:

Charts

Release history

References

External links

2019 songs
2019 singles
2010s ballads
Celine Dion songs
Columbia Records singles
Pop ballads
Songs written by Stephan Moccio
Black-and-white music videos
Songs written by Erik Alcock